Metagama station is a shelter flag stop Via Rail station located in the Unorganized North Sudbury District, Ontario, Canada on the Sudbury – White River train. The stop serves as an access point to the Biscotasi Lake and Spanish River provincial parks.

External links
 Via Rail page for Metagama train station

Via Rail stations in Ontario
Railway stations in Sudbury District